Petrillo may  refer to:
Petrillo (surname)
Myrceugenia correifolia, evergreen shrub commonly referred to as "petrillo"
Petrillo Music Shell, amphitheater in Chicago named after James Petrillo